Ross Adams is an English actor. He plays the role of Scott Drinkwell in the Channel 4 soap opera Hollyoaks and previously played the role of Jeff Bowyer in the BBC Three sitcom The Gemma Factor.

Life and career
Adams moved to Manchester at the age of 18 to study performing arts at the University of Salford. On graduating, he secured an agent and has appeared in several television dramas and comedies including Blue Murder, Emmerdale, I'm With Stupid, and Eleventh Hour alongside Patrick Stewart.

He also works frequently in the field of voice-overs, having voiced several commercials and documentaries, such as Kellogg's Frosties.

He has also previously worked as the assistant to the series producer for Coronation Street before moving to Emmerdale as a storyliner. Having written stories for over 400 episodes he then became a Script Editor; leaving the show in February 2015 to commence filming Hollyoaks.

He is also the founder and Principal of Small Screen Talent; a TV Acting academy and agency for young performers.

Adams was nominated for a RTS Television Award at the Royal Television Society Awards 2010 in the "Best Performance in a Comedy" category for his role as Jeff Bowyer in the BBC Three sitcom, The Gemma Factor.

Adams began appearing as a regular in the Channel 4 soap opera, Hollyoaks, as Scott Drinkwell from April 2015 onwards. He was awarded the British Soap Award for "Best Male Dramatic Performance" in June 2018.

In July 2018, Adams made an appearance as a panelist on Love Island: Aftersun alongside Ferne McCann and Danny Jones.

Personal life
In April 2018, Adams married his boyfriend Phil Crusham.

Awards

References

External links 
 

Living people
Year of birth missing (living people)
English male television actors
Alumni of the University of Salford
English gay actors
Actors from County Durham
People from Stanley, County Durham
English LGBT actors
20th-century English LGBT people
21st-century English LGBT people